This is the discography of Geffen Records and its sister label DGC Records.

1980s

1980
 Donna Summer - The Wanderer
 John Lennon/Yoko Ono - Double Fantasy

1981
 Elton John - The Fox
 Quarterflash - Quarterflash
 Yoko Ono - Season of Glass
 Donna Summer - I'm a Rainbow  (This album was recorded for Geffen Records in 1981,but shelved and not released until 1996 on Mercury/Casablanca Records)

1982
 Sammy Hagar - Standing Hampton
 Original Cast - Dreamgirls
 Asia - Asia
 John Hiatt - All of a Sudden
 Greg Copeland - Revenge Will Come
 Peter Gabriel - Security
 Elton John - Jump Up!
 Adrian Gurvitz - Classic
 Preview - Preview
 Original Cast - Cats (Original London Cast)
 Neil Young - Trans
 Joni Mitchell - Wild Things Run Fast
 Original Cast - The Little Shop of Horrors
 Sammy Hagar - Three Lock Box
 Ric Ocasek - Beatitude
 John Lennon - The John Lennon Collection
 Donna Summer - Donna Summer

1983
 Original Cast - Cats (Selections From The Original Broadway Cast)
 Original Cast - Cats (Original Broadway Cast)
 Mac McAnally - Nothing but the Truth
 Peter Gabriel - Peter Gabriel (reissue)
 Berlin - Pleasure Victim
 Planet P Project - Planet P Project
 Oxo - Oxo
 The Plimsouls - Everywhere at Once
 Madness - Madness
 Wang Chung - Points on the Curve
 Debra Hurd - Debra Hurd
 Elton John - Too Low for Zero
 Joan Rivers - What Becomes a Semi-Legend Most?
 Asia - Alpha
 Jr. Tucker - Jr. Tucker
 Quarterflash - Take Another Picture
 Peter Gabriel - Peter Gabriel Plays Live
 Neil Young - Everybody's Rockin'
 Jennifer Holliday - Feel My Soul
 Monte Video - Monte Video
 Was (Not Was) - Born to Laugh at Tornadoes
 John Hiatt - Riding with the King
 Irene Cara - What a Feelin'
 Preview - Preview

1984
 Whitesnake - Slide It In
 Madness - Keep Moving
 Hagar Schon Aaronson Shrieve - Through the Fire
 Berlin - Love Life
 Don Henley - Building the Perfect Beast
 XTC - Mummer
 Australian Crawl - Semantics
 Siouxsie and the Banshees - Hyæna
 Elton John - Breaking Hearts
 XTC - White Music (reissue)
 XTC - Go 2 (reissue)
 XTC - Drums and Wires (reissue)
 XTC - Black Sea (reissue)
 XTC - English Settlement (reissue)
 XTC - Waxworks: Some Singles 1977-1982 (reissue)
 The Sylvers - Bizarre
 Donna Summer - Cats Without Claws
 Black 'N Blue - Black 'N Blue
 Eric Carmen - Eric Carmen
 Sammy Hagar - VOA
 Original Soundtrack - Gremlins EP
 A Drop in the Gray - Certain Sculptures
 Siouxsie and the Banshees - The Scream (reissue)
 Siouxsie and the Banshees - Join Hands (reissue)
 Siouxsie and the Banshees - Kaleidoscope (reissue)
 Siouxsie and the Banshees - A Kiss in the Dreamhouse (reissue)
 Siouxsie and the Banshees - Juju (reissue)
 Siouxsie and the Banshees - Once Upon a Time: The Singles (reissue)
 Siouxsie and the Banshees - Nocturne (reissue)
 Tom Robinson - Hope and Glory
 XTC - The Big Express

1985
 John Hiatt - Warming Up to the Ice Age
 Shooting Star - Silent Scream
 Vitamin Z - Rites of Passage
 Van Zant - Van Zant
 Lone Justice - Lone Justice
 The Style Council - Internationalists
 Original Soundtrack - The Cotton Club
 Original Soundtrack - Vision Quest
 Lloyd Cole and the Commotions - Rattlesnakes
 Original Broadway Recording - Whoopi Goldberg
 Adam Bomb - Fatal Attraction
 Illusion - Illusion
 Neil Young - Old Ways
 Peter Gabriel - Music from the Film "Birdy"
 Mummy Calls - Mummy Calls
 Asia - Astra
 Jennifer Holliday - Say You Love Me (album)
 Joni Mitchell - Dog Eat Dog (album)
 Black N' Blue - Without Love
 Gary Myrick - Stand for Love
 Elton John - Ice on Fire
 Quarterflash - Back into Blue
 Madness - Mad Not Mad
 Original Soundtrack - Silverado
 Wang Chung - To Live and Die in L.A. (Soundtrack)
 Kitarō - Astral Voyage (reissue)
 Kitarō - Full Moon Story (reissue)
 Kitarō - Millennia (reissue)
 Kitarō - India (reissue)
 Kitarō - Silver Cloud (reissue)
 Kitarō - Asia (reissue)

1986
 Peter Gabriel - So
 Jimmy Barnes - Jimmy Barnes
 Tommy Keene - Songs from the Film
 Aerosmith - Done with Mirrors
 Siouxsie and the Banshees - Tinderbox
 Lloyd Cole & the Commotions - Easy Pieces
 Kitarō - Toward the West
 Ish - On this Corner
 Pat Metheny/Ornette Coleman - Song X
 Lyle Mays - Lyle Mays
 Ric Ocasek - This Side of Paradise
 Models - Out of Mind, Out of Sight
 Esquire - Esquire
 The Style Council - Home and Abroad
 Bill Cosby - Those of You With or Without Children, You'll Understand
 Peter Case - Peter Case
 Neil Young - Landing on Water
 Dazz Band - Wild & Free
 Black N' Blue - Nasty Nasty
 Kitarō - Tenku
 Elton John - Leather Jackets
 Wang Chung - Mosaic
 It Bites - The Big Lad in the Windmill
 XTC - Skylarking
 Gene Loves Jezebel - Discover
 Chameleons UK - Strange Times
 Tesla - Mechanical Resonance
 Berlin - Count Three & Pray
 Lone Justice - Shelter
 Debbie Harry - Rockbird
 Ray Parker Jr. - After Dark
 Original Soundtrack - Little Shop of Horrors
 Sammy Hagar - Looking Back
 Tommy Keene - Run Now
 Jesse's Gang - Center of Attraction
 Slayer - Reign in Blood

1987
 Tom Scott - The Lonesome Sound
 Victoria Williams - Happy Come Home
 Vaneese Thomas - Vaneese Thomas
 Y&T - Contagious
 Ezo - EZO
 Sammy Hagar - I Never Said Goodbye
  Little America - Little America
 Pat Metheny Group - Still Life (Talking)
 Jimmy Barnes - Freight Train Heart
 John Wetton & Phil Manzanera - Wetton/Manzanera
 Siouxsie and the Banshees - Through the Looking Glass
 Whitesnake - Whitesnake
 Guns N' Roses - Appetite for Destruction
 Fuzzbox - We've Got a Fuzzbox and We're Gonna Use It
 Jennifer Holliday - Get Close to My Love
 Original Cast - Les Misérables
 John White - Night People
 Elton John - Elton John's Greatest Hits Vol. III: 1979-1987
 Neil Young & Crazy Horse - Life
 Nitzer Ebb - That Total Age
 Geoffrey Downes & the New Dance Orchestra - The Light Program
 Robbie Robertson - Robbie Robertson
 Original Soundtrack - Innerspace
 Aerosmith - Permanent Vacation
 Kitarō - The Light of the Spirit
 Cher - Cher
 Gene Loves Jezebel - Promise
 Whitesnake - Come an' Get It (reissue)
 Whitesnake - Live...In the Heart of the City (reissue)
 Dukes of Stratosphear - Chips from the Chocolate Fireball
 Gene Loves Jezebel - The House of the Dolls
 Donna Summer- All Systems Go

1988
 Joni Mitchell - Chalk Mark in a Rain Storm
 Whitesnake - Saints & Sinners (reissue)
 Whitesnake - Snakebite (reissue)
 Whitesnake - Trouble (reissue)
 Whitesnake - Lovehunter (reissue)
 Various Artists - Scream: The Compilation
 Danny Wilde - Any Man's Hunger
 Black 'N Blue - In Heat
 3 - To the Power of Three
 The Sun & The Moon - Sun & The Moon
 Original Cast - Follies
 Virginia Astley - Hope in a Darkened Heart
 Vitamin Z - Sharp Stone Rain
 Berlin - The Best of Berlin, 1979-1988
 Jimmy Page - Outrider
 It Bites - Once Around the World
 John Kilzer - Memory in the Making
 Mac McAnally - Finish Lines
 Edie Brickell & the New Bohemians - Shooting Rubberbands at the Stars
 Rock City Angels - Young Man's Blues
 Steve Forbert - Streets of This Town
 Kylie Minogue - Kylie
 Guns N' Roses - G N' R Lies
 The 7A3 - Coolin' in Cali
 The Toll - The Price of Progression
 Original Soundtrack - Beetlejuice
 Slayer - South of Heaven
 Lyle Mays - Street Dreams
 Siouxsie and the Banshees - Peepshow
 Peter Gabriel - Passion: Music for The Last Temptation of Christ
 Kitarō - Ten Years
 Danzig - Danzig
 7A3 - Coolin' in Cali
 Guns N' Roses - Appetite for Destruction (clean)

1989
 Masters of Reality - Masters of Reality
 Blue Murder - Blue Murder
 Nitzer Ebb - Belief
 Andrew Dice Clay - Dice
 Wolfsbane - Live Fast, Die Fast
 Stan Ridgway - Mosquitos
 Don Henley - The End of the Innocence
 XTC - Oranges and Lemons
 Christopher Williams - Adventures in Paradise
 Tommy Keene - Based on Happy Times
 Wang Chung - The Warmer Side of Cool
 Nikki - Nikki
 Tesla - The Great Radio Controversy
 Junkyard - Junkyard
 Michael Thompson Band - Michael Thompson Band
 Little America - Fairgrounds
 David Peaston - Introducing David Peaston
 Maria McKee - Maria McKee
 EZO - Fire Fire
 Fuzzbox - Big Bang!
 Chris Rea - The Best of Chris Rea: New Light Through Old Windows
 Enya - Watermark
 Various Artists - Greenpeace: Rainbow Warriors
 Peter Case - The Man with the Blue Post-Modern Fragmented Neo-Traditionalist Guitar
 Cher - Heart of Stone
 Pat Metheny Group - Letter from Home
 Rickie Lee Jones - Flying Cowboys
 John Hiatt - Y'all Caught? The Ones That Got Away 1979-1985
 Tommy Bolin - The Ultimate: The Best of Tommy Bolin
 Whitesnake - Slip of the Tongue
 Was (Not Was) - Born to Laugh at Tornadoes
 Aerosmith - Pump

1990s

1990
 Conway Twitty - Crazy in Love(Music Video Only)
 Kitarō - Kojiki
 Lori Carson - Shelter
 Olivia Newton-John - Warm and Tender
 Gene Loves Jezebel - Kiss of Life
 It Bites - Eat Me in St. Louis
 Hanoi Rocks - Bangkok Shocks, Saigon Shakes, Hanoi Rocks
 Hanoi Rocks - Oriental Beat
 Hanoi Rocks - Self Destruction Blues
 Hanoi Rocks - Back to Mystery City
 Hanoi Rocks - All Those Wasted Years: Live at the Marquee
 Trouble - Trouble
 Salty Dog - Every Dog Has Its Day
 Original Cast - Miss Saigon
 Kylie Minogue - Enjoy Yourself
 Shadowland - Shadowland
 The Creatures - Boomerang
 Chris Rea - The Road to Hell
 The Sundays - Reading, Writing, and Arithmetic
 Black Crowes - Shake Your Money Maker
 Don Dokken - Up From The Ashes
Thunder - Backstreet Symphony
 Lock Up - Something Bitchin' This Way Comes
 Death Angel - Act III
 Danzig - Danzig II: Lucifuge
 Gutterboy - Gutterboy
 Y&T - Ten
 Nitzer Ebb - Showtime
 Warrior Soul - Last Decade Dead Century
 Shadowland - Beauty of Escaping
 Andrew Dice Clay - The Day the Laughter Died
 Little Caesar - Little Caesar
 Tesla - Five Man Acoustical Jam
 Nelson - After the Rain
 John Doe - Meet John Doe
 Willi Jones - Willi Jones
 Silk Tymes Leather - It Ain't Where Ya From...It's Where Ya At
 Pat Metheny, Dave Holland, Roy Haynes - Question and Answer
 Original Soundtrack - Days of Thunder
 Brothers Figaro - Gypsy Beat
 Notorious - Notorious
 Sonic Youth - Goo
 Asia - Then & Now

1991
 Cher - Love Hurts
 Apollo Smile - Apollo Smile
 Joni Mitchell - Night Ride Home
 Robbie Robertson - Storyville
 Edie Brickell & New Bohemians - Ghost of a Dog
 The Posies - Dear 23
 Northside - Chicken Rhythms
 Slayer - Seasons in the Abyss
 The Simpsons - The Simpsons Sing the Blues
 Original Soundtrack - Mermaids
 I, Napoleon - I, Napoleon
 The Throbs - The Language of Thieves and Vagabonds
 Tyketto - Don't Come Easy
 Junkyard - Sixes, Sevens & Nines
 Copyright - ©
 John Kilzer - Busman's Holiday
 Kitarō - Live in America
 Bill Cosby - Oh, Baby!
 Galactic Cowboys - Galactic Cowboys
 Tesla - Psychotic Supper
 Warrior Soul - Drugs, God and the New Republic
 Michael W. Smith - Go West Young Man
 Peter Gabriel - Shaking the Tree: Sixteen Golden Greats
 Guns N' Roses - Use Your Illusion I
 Guns N' Roses - Use Your Illusion II
 Nirvana - Nevermind
 Neil Young - Lucky Thirteen
 Yasmin - Yasmin

1992
 Arc Angels - Arc Angels
 Peter Gabriel - Us
 Nirvana - Incesticide
 Thunder - Laughing on Judgement Day
 Little Caesar - Influence
 Izzy Stradlin and the Ju Ju Hounds
 Warrior Soul - Salutations from the Ghetto Nation
 Jackyl - Jackyl
 Roxy Blue - Want Some?
 Cher - Greatest Hits: 1965–1992 (non-US release)

1993
 Blue Murder - Nothin' But Trouble
 Coverdale/Page - Coverdale•Page
 Galactic Cowboys - Space In Your Face
 Counting Crows - August and Everything After
 St. Johnny - Speed Is Dreaming
 Nirvana - In Utero
 Eleanor McEvoy - Eleanor McEvoy (album)
 Guns N' Roses - "The Spaghetti Incident?"
 Duff McKagan - Believe in Me
 Pariah - To Mock a Killingbird
 Warrior Soul - Chill Pill
 Phantom Blue - Built to Perform
 Aerosmith - Get a Grip
 Noa - Noa

1994
 Weezer - Weezer
 Aerosmith - Big Ones
 Pride & Glory - Pride & Glory
 Tesla - Bust a Nut
 Whitesnake - Whitesnake's Greatest Hits
 Jackyl - Push Comes to Shove
 Sammy Hagar - Unboxed
 Peter Gabriel - Secret World Live
 Slash's Snakepit - It's Five O'Clock Somewhere
 Eagles - Hell Freezes Over
 Nirvana - Unplugged in New York
 Hole - Live Through This

1995
 Lisa Loeb & Nine Stories - Tails
 Don Henley - Actual Miles: Henley's Greatest Hits
 Tesla - Times Makin' Changes - The Best of Tesla
 GZA - Liquid Swords

1996
 Beck - Odelay
 Counting Crows - Recovering the Satellites
 Nirvana - From the Muddy Banks of the Wishkah
 Manowar - Louder Than Hell
 Weezer - Pinkerton

1997
 10,000 Maniacs - Love Among the Ruins
 Wang Chung - Everybody Wang Chung Tonight: Wang Chung's Greatest Hits
 Bloodhound Gang - One Fierce Beer Coaster
 Lisa Loeb - Firecracker
 Southern Culture on the Skids - Plastic Seat Sweat
 Quarterflash - Harden My Heart: The Best of Quarterflash
 60ft. Dolls - The Big 3
 Snot  - Get Some
 Whiskeytown - Strangers Almanac

1998
 Beck - Mutations
 Aerosmith - A Little South of Sanity
 Counting Crows - Across a Wire: Live in New York City
 Izzy Stradlin - 117"
 Killah Priest - Heavy Mental
 Jackyl - Choice Cuts
 Whiskeytown - Faithless Street (reissue)
 Pitchshifter - www.pitchshifter.com
 Pure Sugar - Pure Sugar
 Hole - Celebrity Skin
Rob Zombie - Hellbilly Deluxe

1999
 Counting Crows - This Desert Life
 Izzy Stradlin - Ride On

2000's

2000
 Lifehouse - No Name Face
 Guns N' Roses - Live Era '87-'93
 Cold - 13 Ways to Bleed on Stage

2001
 Weezer - Weezer

2002
 Lifehouse - Stanley Climbfall
 Weezer - Maladroit
 Trust Company - The Lonely Position of Neutral
 Counting Crows - Hard Candy
 Peter Gabriel - Up
 Beck - Sea Change
Cinder - Soul Creation [Single]
Nirvana - Nirvana
 The Bathroom Wall - Jimmy Fallon

2003
 Blink-182 - Blink-182
 Lo-Pro - Lo-Pro

2004
 The Cure - The Cure (I AM/Geffen)
 Ashlee Simpson - Autobiography
 Rise Against - Siren Song of the Counter Culture
 Papa Roach - Getting Away with Murder

2005
 Lifehouse - Lifehouse
 The Starting Line - Based on a True Story
 Weezer - Make Believe
 Common - Be (GOOD/Geffen)
 Shaggy - Clothes Drop
 Ashlee Simpson - I Am Me
 Blink-182 - Greatest Hits
 Mary J. Blige -  The Breakthrough

2006
 Angels & Airwaves - We Don't Need to Whisper (Suretone/Geffen)
 Rise Against - The Sufferer & the Witness
 Papa Roach - The Paramour Sessions
 The Game - Doctor's Advocate
 Snoop Dogg - Tha Blue Carpet Treatment
 Nelly Furtado - Loose (Mosley/Geffen)

2007
 Lifehouse - Who We Are
 Common - Finding Forever (GOOD/Geffen)
 Angels & Airwaves - I-Empire (Suretone/Geffen)
 Mary J. Blige - Growing Pains (Geffen)
 Keyshia Cole - Just Like You (Interscope/Geffen/Confidential)

2008
 The Cure - 4:13 Dream (I AM/Geffen)
 Kardinal Offishall - Not 4 Sale (Kon Live/Black Jays/Geffen)
 Snoop Dogg - Ego Trippin' (Doggystyle/Geffen)
 Solange Knowles - Sol-Angel and the Hadley St. Dreams (Music World/Geffen)
 The Game - LAX (Black Wall Street/Geffen)
 Guns N' Roses - Chinese Democracy (Geffen)
 Ashlee Simpson - Bittersweet World (Geffen)
 Common - Universal Mind Control (GOOD/Geffen)
 Tesla - Forever More (Geffen)
 Keyshia Cole - A Different Me (Geffen)
 Shirley Bassey - The Performance (Geffen)

2009 

 Orianthi - Believe (Geffen)
 Weezer - Raditude (DGC/Interscope/Geffen)

2010s

2010 

 Keyshia Cole - Calling All Hearts (Geffen)
 Lifehouse - Smoke & Mirrors (Geffen)
 The Like - Release Me (Geffen)

2011 

 Greyson Chance - Hold On 'til the Night (eleveneleven/Maverick/Geffen/Streamline)
 The Game - The R.E.D. Album (Black Wall Street/DGC)

2012 

 Keyshia Cole - Woman to Woman (Geffen/Interscope)
 Lifehouse - Almería (Geffen)
 The Game - Jesus Piece (Black Wall Street/DGC)

2018 

 Yungblud - 21st Century Liability (Locomotion/Geffen/Interscope)
 Jacob Collier - Djesse Vol. 1 (Hajanga/Geffen/Decca)

2019 

 DJ Snake - Carte Blanche (Geffen)
 Gryffin - Gravity (Darkroom/Geffen)
 Jacob Collier - Djesse Vol. 2 (Hajanga/Geffen/Decca)

2020s

2020 
 Lil Durk - Just Cause Y'all Waited 2 (Only the Family/Alamo/Geffen)
 Smokepurpp - Florida Jit (Alamo/Geffen)
 Hotboii - Double O Baby (Geffen/Interscope/Rebel/Hitmaker/22)
 Lil Durk - The Voice (Only the Family/Alamo/Geffen)

2021 
 Smokepurpp - PSYCHO (Legally Insane) EP (Alamo/Geffen)
 Olivia Rodrigo - Sour (Geffen)
 SpotemGottem - Most Wanted (Rebel/Geffen)
 Lil Huddy - Teenage Heartbreak (Immersive/Sandlot/Geffen)
 Hotboii - Life Of A Hotboii (Rebel/Hitmaker/22/Geffen)
 Ann Marie - Hate Love (Geffen)
 SpotemGottem - Back From The Dead (Rebel/Geffen)

2022 
 Yeat - 2 Alive (Geffen/Field Trip/Twizzy Rich)

Unreleased albums
 Large Professor - The LP
 Shirley Bassey - The Performance (Geffen)

References

Discographies of American record labels